Spikkestad Station is a railway station located at Spikkestad in Røyken, Norway, and is the terminus of the Spikkestad Line. It was opened as part of the Drammen Line on 3 February 1885, but in 1973 the new Lieråsen Tunnel opened through Lieråsen, and the old part of the Drammen Line became a commuter train line with Spikkestad, which is today is primarily a residential town, as its western terminus.

The station is served by a half-hourly service of commuter trains running to Asker, Sandvika, and Oslo Central Station (journey time: 52 minutes) and then on to Lillestrøm.

The old station building, which was originally built to serve Høvik and was moved from there in 1922, today stands a hundred metres or so distant from the end of the line, following redevelopment of the station area in 2012-16 and the construction of new platforms.

References

External links

1885 establishments in Norway
Railway stations in Røyken
Railway stations on the Spikkestad Line
Railway stations opened in 1885